Dismorphia pseudolewyi is a butterfly in the family Pieridae. It is found in Bolivia.

Adults have white undersides that are mottled in grey and yellow.

References

Dismorphiinae
Butterflies described in 1955